The Cisco Supervisor Engine is the brain of many of Cisco's switches.  The Supervisor Engine has evolved several times.  While it is the management segment of many routers, the power of the switch is often much greater than that of the Supervisor Engine because one of the features of many switches is that dozens of the functions are accelerated by ASIC chips.

Abridged list of features:

 802.1q VLAN
 Spanning Tree Protocol
 Ether Channel
 Jumbo Frames
 (E)IGRP, OSPF, RIP (2), Static Routing
 BGP, IS-IS
 QOS
 Some have Layer 3 and 4 Switching

Specifications

Details 

Supervisor Engine I
 68EC040
 Chassis: 2900, 2948G, 2980G, 4000, 4500, 5000, 5500, 6000, 6500, 7600

Supervisor Engine II
 MIPS R4700
 Chassis: 2926, 4000, 4500, 5000, 5500, 6000, 6500, 7600

Supervisor Engine II+
 MIPS R4700
 Cisco Express Forwarding
 Chassis: 2926, 4000, 4500, 5000, 5500, 6000, 6500, 7600

Supervisor Engine III
 Cisco Express Forwarding
 Max DRAM: 256MB SD
 Redundant Capable
 Netflow accelerator card

Supervisor Engine IV
 Cisco Express Forwarding
 Max Flash: 64MB (supplemental Compact Flash optional)

 
Supervisor Engine V
 Cisco Express Forwarding
 Chassis: 4500

Supervisor Engine 6
 Cisco Express Forwarding
 Chassis: 4500 "E" Series

Supervisor Engine 32
 Cisco Express Forwarding
 Chassis: 6000, 6500, 7600
 A low cost, reduced version of the 720
 Policy Feature Card 3b
 MSFC 2A?

Supervisor Engine 720
 Cisco Express Forwarding
 Policy Feature Card 3A, 3B, 3BXL
 Chassis: 6500, 7600

MSFC1-3
 Multi-Layer Switch Feature Card

See also 

 Cisco IOS
 Catalyst switch
 Catalyst 6500
 Cisco Catalyst 4500 Series Switches

References 

http://www.cisco.com/en/US/products/hw/switches/ps663/products_tech_note09186a00801a5d58.shtml
http://www.ciscosystems.com/en/US/prod/collateral/switches/ps5718/ps4324/product_data_sheet09186a00801fcaba.pdf
http://www.cisco.ac/application/pdf/en/us/guest/products/ps4324/c1167/ccmigration_09186a008011b8da.pdf
http://www.berkcom.com/resources/cisco/C6500_ccmigration_09186a00800887fd.pdf
http://www.cisco.com/en/US/products/hw/switches/ps663/products_tech_note09186a0080094645.shtml
 
 
 
 
 

Cisco products
Cisco Systems